Sheraz Ali (born 27 February 1990) is a Pakistani cricketer who plays for Karachi. He made his first-class debut on 7 December 2015 in the 2015–16 Quaid-e-Azam Trophy.

References

External links
 

1990 births
Living people
Pakistani cricketers
Karachi cricketers
Cricketers from Karachi